Sir William Spring, 2nd Baronet (1642–1684) was an English Whig politician who was Member of Parliament for Suffolk from 1679 until his death in 1684.

Early life
Spring was the son of Sir William Spring, 1st Baronet and Elizabeth L'Estrange, daughter of Alice L'Estrange and Sir Hamon le Strange. He was educated at King Edward VI School and Christ's College, Cambridge, graduating in 1658. In 1654 he inherited his father's baronetcy.

Career
He was removed from the Commission of the Peace for Suffolk in 1670 for opposing the Conventicle Act 1664. He served as High Sheriff of Suffolk in 1674. He contested the Sudbury constituency in 1679, but lost. He was subsequently elected to represent Suffolk in both the second and third Exclusion Parliaments as an exclusionist. The Earl of Shaftesbury classed him as an "honest" opponent of James, Duke of York inheriting the throne. Although he moved away from his father's Puritan beliefs, Spring was still concerned by the increasing Catholicisation of the Church of England over his lifetime. On 14 February 1681, after he and Sir Samuel Barnardiston had been unanimously elected, an address was presented to them from the freeholders of the constituency, thanking them for their "zeal for the Protestant religion, your loyalty to his Majesty’s person and government, and your endeavours for the preservation of our laws, rights and liberties" and urging them to continue their support of exclusion. He made no recorded speeches and was not appointed to any committees in either of the exclusion parliaments. He died in 1684.

Marriages and children
Spring was married twice. On 11 October 1661, he first married Mary, daughter of Dudley North, 4th Baron North; they had no children. On 3 February 1667, he married secondly Sarah, daughter of Sir Robert Cordell, 1st Baronet of Melford Hall, Suffolk and together they had three children:
 Sir Thomas Spring, 3rd Baronet, married Merolina, daughter and co-heiress of Thomas Jermyn, 2nd Baron Jermyn and heiress of the Jacobite Earl of Dover.
 Sir John Spring, 5th Baronet, married Elizabeth Nightingale.
 Sarah Spring, married John Macky.

Ancestry

References

1642 births
1684 deaths
Alumni of Christ's College, Cambridge
Baronets in the Baronetage of England
English MPs 1679
English MPs 1681
High Sheriffs of Suffolk
People educated at King Edward VI School, Bury St Edmunds
William
Whig members of the pre-1707 English Parliament